Black Cat Roundabout is on the junction between the A1 and A421 (formerly A428) Bedford road just south of St Neots. It was reconstructed in 2005-6 as part of the Great Barford bypass works to allow access to the new dual carriageway bypass. 

It takes its name from the garage and car repair workshop which opened in the 1920s at the junction called the Black Cat Garage. In later years the garage was converted to a nightclub and then a restaurant, before becoming derelict for many years. In the 1980s, the current large covered petrol station was opened on the site.

A metal black cat sign was installed on the roundabout in January 2004, taking its shape from the cat on the original garage clock tower. During construction of the Great Barford bypass the black cat was temporarily relocated to the construction site office, before a second larger cat was returned to the roundabout upon completion in 2006. However, this sign was stolen during the summer of 2007. On 12 August 2008 it was announced that a third replacement Black Cat had been installed on the roundabout. In April 2009 the original sign was returned (albeit to a different location), accompanied by a note saying it had been found in a ditch.

The roundabout can regularly be heard being referred to on traffic reports because of the major traffic jams that it causes on the A1.

2005-6 reconstruction

The roundabout was reconstructed in 2005-6 as part of the Great Barford bypass works to allow access to the new dual carriageway bypass. The roundabout was made much larger to incorporate the extra junction but no measures were taken to improve general traffic flow. The roundabout is considered to be one of the most dangerous junctions on the A1

2014-15 reconstruction
The Highways Agency began work on 23 June 2014 to reconstruct the roundabout and its approaches.  The £5.6M project, part of the 'pinch point' programme, made the roundabout bigger and added traffic lights.

Planned replacement (mid 2020s)
On 18 February 2019, Highways England announced final route selection to replace the single-carriageway section of the A428  from Caxton Gibbet to the A1, with construction to begin in 2022.  This work, which reroutes the A1A14 link so as to connect directly to the A421, will completely replace the roundabout with a three-level grade separated junction.

In March 2021, Highways England announced that it had signed a contract with Skanska to construct the new road, which it expects to open to traffic in 20252026.

Numbering
In September 2021, National Highways announced that this new section of dual carriageway will be designated A421 (and the bypassed sections will be renumbered as A1428 and B1428).

See also

 Oxford to Cambridge Expressway, which would have taken over the routes currently designated A421 and A428 but the section between the M1 and M40 was cancelled on 18 March 2021.

References

External links
Photos of the Black Cat on the Roundabout
Highways Agency - History of Black Cat Roundabout
Bad Junctions - Black Cat Roundabout
Highways Agency Press Release
Black Cat roundabout on Google Maps

Roundabouts in England
Transport in Bedfordshire
St Neots
A1 road (Great Britain)